St Joseph's Football Club, created in 1912, is an association football club based in Gibraltar. It currently plays in the Gibraltar Football League. The club also has two Futsal teams and more than 10 youth teams. In 2013, they established links as a feeder club to Real Balompédica Linense. The club was granted an official UEFA licence in 2015.

History
Formed in 1912, St Joseph's are Gibraltar's oldest still existing football club, with the next oldest, Manchester 62, formed 50 years later. They have consistently competed in the Gibraltar Premier Division in that time.  However, they have only won the title once: in the 1995–96 season. They have seen considerably better fortunes in the Rock Cup, however, with 10 titles in their history, including a league and cup double in 1996. Their last Rock Cup triumph came in 2013.

Since Gibraltar became a member of UEFA, the Saints have seen more mixed fortunes, including narrowly avoiding relegation in the 2013–14 season, ending up in the relegation play-off and narrowly beating Mons Calpe to retain their Premier Division status. Since that near miss, they have consistently finished in the top half of the league, and in 2017 qualified for the UEFA Europa League for the first time with a 3rd-place finish, after Gibraltar had been given an additional spot in the competition. However, their maiden campaign would be short-lived as they suffered a resounding 10-0 aggregate defeat to AEL Limassol of Cyprus. In August, the club were hit when two players, club captain Esteban Montes and Alberto Montaño, were imposed with five and three year bans from football in Gibraltar, respectively, for breaching rules on betting. Both players were immediately released from the club.

The club quickly established themselves at one of the "Big Three" of Gibraltarian football in the UEFA era before running into financial difficulties in early 2022. As a result of this, in June that year, former Burnley owner and chairman Mike Garlick purchased the club, with Weymouth owner Mark Palmer also joining the board.

Achievements
Gibraltar Football League: 1
 1995–96
Rock Cup Titles: 10
 1956, 1979, 1983, 1984, 1985, 1987, 1992, 1996, 2012, 2013
Gibraltar Women's Football League: 1
 2007

Current squad

First team

Intermediate team

European record

Accurate as of match played 28 July 2022

Legend: GF = Goals For. GA = Goals Against. GD = Goal Difference.

Notes
 PR: Preliminary round
 1Q: First qualifying round

References

External links 

 

Football clubs in Gibraltar
Gibraltar National League clubs
1912 establishments in Gibraltar
Association football clubs established in 1912